Carthage is a community in the Township of Perth East, Perth County, Ontario, Canada. Smith Creek passes through the community.

See also

 List of unincorporated communities in Ontario

References

Communities in Perth County, Ontario